Limenas Litochorou or Gritsa is a coastal village of the Dio-Olympos municipality. Before the 2011 local government reform it was part of the municipality of Litochoro. The settlement of Limenas Litochorou had a population of 9 inhabitants as of 2011. Limenas Litochorou is a part of the community of Litochoro.

See also
List of settlements in the Pieria regional unit

References

Populated places in Pieria (regional unit)
Tourist attractions in Central Macedonia